Chuukese (also Trukese) may refer to:

 anything from
 Chuuk State
 Chuuk Lagoon
 Chuukese people
 Chuukese language

Language and nationality disambiguation pages